Makhdoom Saeed-uz-Zaman is a Pakistani politician who had been a member of the National Assembly of Pakistan, from February 2016 to May 2018.

Political career

He was elected to the National Assembly of Pakistan as a candidate of Pakistan Peoples Party (PPP) from Constituency NA-218 (Matiari-cum-Hyderabad) in by-election held in January 2016. He received 114,079 votes and defeated Farman Shah, a candidate of Majlis Wahdat-e-Muslimeen. The seat became vacant after Ameen Faheem who won it in 2013 election, died.

References

Living people
Pakistan People's Party politicians
Sindhi people
Pakistani MNAs 2013–2018
People from Sindh
 People from Matiari District
Makhdoom family
Year of birth missing (living people)